Kam Air Flight 904 was a scheduled passenger domestic flight, flying from Herat Airfield in Herat to Kabul International Airport in Afghanistan's capital of Kabul. On 3 February 2005, the aircraft impacted mountainous terrain, killing all 97 passengers and 8 crew on board.

The incident took place shortly after 4:00 p.m. local time (UTC+4:30) when the Kam Air Boeing 737-200 operated by Phoenix Aviation went missing. The plane was on approach to Kabul. At the time of the incident, a heavy snowstorm was observed in the area.

The crash is the deadliest air disaster in the history of Afghanistan.

Accident
The aircraft lost communication during the worst winter snowstorm in 5 years. The cause of the loss of communication, and the subsequent crash, is unknown. Taliban leader Mullah Dadullah stated that his guerrilla fighters had not shot down the plane and expressed sadness at the crash. Air traffic control for the Kabul area was provided by the International Security Assistance Force (ISAF). Near to Kabul is Bagram Air Base, which has been in control of the U.S. military forces. It would have been possible for flight 904 to divert and land at Bagram Air Base instead of Kabul International Airport.

At the time of the accident, there was no established intra-governmental agency plan in Afghanistan to deal with a major aircraft crash. Initially, it was proposed that the Ministry of Transportation be responsible for not only the investigation but also human remains identification and recovery and wreckage recovery. When the logic of this concept fell apart because of the small size of the MOT and its almost total lack of resources, these duties were divided among the Ministry of Defense and Ministry of Health (human remains), the Ministry of the Interior (wreckage recovery), and the MOT (the actual accident investigation).

Recovery operation and investigation

A rescue operation was launched under atrocious weather conditions by the ISAF and Afghan National Army (ANA), and the tail of the plane was sighted from two Dutch Apache helicopters at around 9:30 a.m. UTC.

The ISAF made numerous unsuccessful rescue attempts by helicopters.  When those attempts failed the Afghan Ministry of Defense ordered the ANA's Central Corps to assemble a team to attempt a rescue of victims presumed to be alive.  The Afghan National Army Commando responded on foot but were forced to leave due to a snowstorm.  On the fourth day after the crash, an ISAF rescue team was able to reach the crash site and confirmed that all passengers and crew were dead.

The helicopter crew confirmed the wreckage site with the aircraft sensors and reported back their find. The ridge was a daunting place; sheer on one side, steeply sloping on the other with deep snowfields, and swept by high winds or covered in freezing fog. The snow hid any local tracks or paths and the approach roads from nearby villages were impassable to vehicles, despite several attempts by ISAF and ANA patrols to find a way to the summit. The winter weather did not give another opportunity until 7 February when a window of clear weather allowed an ISAF Spanish Cougar helicopter to set down a 5-man team of Slovenian mountain rescue troops onto the ridge summit. Pushing on through the waist-deep snow and conscious of the possible mine threat, the team reached the site. Although the team found no human remains, the badly broken up debris scattered along the ridgeline and the extreme conditions made it very unlikely that anyone had survived the crash.

It was discovered that all 105 passengers and crew on board were killed, and the plane was completely destroyed.  The flight data recorder was found after an extensive and extremely difficult search and turned over to US National Transportation Safety Board analysis. The recorder did not contain any valid data from the flight. The cockpit voice recorder, which would provide crucial information about the actions of the flight crew during the approach, was never located.

The accident site itself was compact horizontally, but not vertically. The aircraft struck a ridge line on an easterly heading near the crest of the mountain about  down from the top. The final flight path probably had some amount of upward vector to it, because the fuselage forward of the wing box was propelled, in fragments, over the crest and fell over the cliff side into the valley below. The actual wreckage documentation during five site visits was difficult because most of the parts were either buried under several feet of snow and inaccessible, outside the mine-free cordon and inaccessible, or down the cliff side and, therefore, also inaccessible to all without mountain climbing training.  The most prominent and recognizable piece of wreckage present was the vertical stabilizer and a small portion of the rear fuselage. Most of the visible wreckage was located between two stacked stone, roofless structures that were observation posts used by Mujahadeen fighters to monitor Soviet troop movements in the Kabul valley during the 1980s. Within a  circle, after a lot of arduous snow removal, investigators identified portions of both engines, both wings, the left main landing gear assembly, many aft galley components, the horizontal stabilizer, human remains and personal effects, and much miscellaneous debris. Some material, such as an escape slide and some right engine components, were located outside the landmine-free area. These items were documented with binoculars and digital camera zoom features.

The investigative team faced very challenging weather conditions, difficult terrain, and potential landmine hazards. The evidence recovered from the site was insufficient to determine a definite cause for the crash, but the location suggested that the crew had descended below the minimum descent altitude for the phase of the approach that they were in. Without the cockpit voice recorder, survivors, witnesses, or a valid flight data recording, the investigation stalled. In 2006, the Civil Aviation Operation of the Ministry of Transport of Afghanistan released their final report concluding that the plane flew into terrain below the ideal approach path, most likely as a result of pilot error.

Casualties
Of the 105 people on board, 97 were passengers and eight were crew. At least 25 were foreign nationals: 9 Turkish, 6 Americans, 4 Russians, 3 Italians, 1 Dutch, and 1 Iranian, as well as the first officer, who held dual citizenship in Canada and Russia. According to reports, the Russians were crew members, the Turkish were civilians working for Turkey-based firms, and the Italians included an architect working for the United Nations, Andrea Pollastri, as well as another Italian civilian and a navy captain. Three of the six Americans on board were women working for the Cambridge, Massachusetts-based NGO Management Sciences for Health (MSH), and one was a Dutch water resources engineer, team-leader for a development project in the western basins.

Kam Air
Kam Air is a private airline established in 2003 operating a fleet of leased Boeing and Antonov aircraft on both domestic and international routes. The plane that crashed during flight 904 was a Boeing 737-200 registered EX-037, which was originally delivered to Nordair as C-GNDR in 1980. It had been leased by Kam Air and operated by Phoenix Aviation, a firm based at Sharjah, United Arab Emirates.

See also

Controlled Flight into terrain (CFIT)
Pamir Airways Flight 112 where the plane was lost in very poor weather conditions on approach to Kabul International Airport, killing all 43 on board.

References

External links
Univ of Denver Grad on Flight 904 (Archive)
CBS report
Reuters Reports (Archive)
Black Box given to US NTSB 
Owners of Afghan crash plane blame weather
Report of Robert Benzon NSTB investigator
CHERI GHAR CRASH SITE- ISAF Mirror April 2005

2005 disasters in Afghanistan
Aviation accidents and incidents in Afghanistan
2005 in Afghanistan
Aviation accidents and incidents in 2005
Airliner accidents and incidents involving controlled flight into terrain
Accidents and incidents involving the Boeing 737 Original
February 2005 events in Asia